Ossian Studios Inc. is a developer of role-playing game content for the Neverwinter Nights and Neverwinter Nights 2 franchise of PC games.

History

2003 Ossian Studios Inc, is founded
Located in Burnaby, Canada Ossian Studios was founded in 2003 by Alan Miranda (CEO) and his wife Elizabeth Starr (COO). The company name was inspired by the legendary Celtic warrior-bard Ossian, who told tales of epic adventures and travelled the underworld paradise of the Land of Youth called "Tir na n-Og", where warriors feasted, battled and died, but were reborn again the next day to feast and battle into eternity.

Alan Miranda (CEO)
Alan Miranda is a former BioWare producer, having been the producer on Baldur's Gate II: Throne of Bhaal and the associate producer on Neverwinter Nights. Prior to working at BioWare he was a designer at Relic Entertainment developing some of the core game mechanics and missions for the RTS Impossible Creatures. He is now the producer of all games developed at Ossian Studios. Alan holds a B.A. in Economics from the University of British Columbia, and a diploma in 2D and 3D Video Games Programming from DigiPen Applied Computer Graphics School.

Games

Darkness over Daggerford

Darkness of Daggerford is a module for Neverwinter Nights, taking place in the Forgotten Realms. The game adds a brand new world map system complete with random encounters, a player stronghold to enable more challenging quests and featuring new player customization options, a custom spawning and leveling system and 5 new music tracks.

Computer Games Magazine gave the game a glowing review.

Mysteries of Westgate

Mysteries of Westgate is the first Adventure Pack for Neverwinter Nights 2 that was developed by Ossian, set in the most corrupt city in the Forgotten Realms. This game boasts over 15 hours of non-linear gameplay added to Neverwinter Nights 2 with new creatures, music, voice over and multiple paths and endings. Players can explore 4 districts of the city of Westgate: Harbor Loop, Market Triangle, Arena District, and subterranean Undergate.

PC Gamer Magazine and Games for Windows Magazine both spoke highly about the add-on.

The Shadow Sun
The Shadow Sun is an RPG created by Ossian set in a universe of the same name. Unlike their previous products, The Shadow Sun has no ties to D&D or the Forgotten Realms in any way. The game was released on December 19, 2013 for iOS devices and on November 21, 2014 for Android devices.

Tyrants of the Moonsea

Tyrants of the Moonsea is a premium module that was released for Neverwinter Nights: Enhanced Edition in August 2019 and is based on an incomplete module by Luke Scull. It was made with the help of Scull and other modders and designers from the website Arelith.

References

External links
 

Video game companies of Canada
Companies based in Burnaby
Video game companies established in 2003
2003 establishments in British Columbia
Canadian companies established in 2003
Video game development companies